Ann Cinnika Beiming (born 1972) is a Swedish politician and former member of the Riksdag, the national legislature. A member of the Social Democratic Party, she represented Stockholm County between October 1998 and October 2006. She was also a substitute member of the Riksdag for Pär Nuder between February 1997 and October 1998.

References

1972 births
20th-century Swedish women politicians
20th-century Swedish politicians
21st-century Swedish women politicians
Living people
Members of the Riksdag 1998–2002
Members of the Riksdag 2002–2006
Members of the Riksdag from the Social Democrats
Women members of the Riksdag